Lunovula boucheti is a species of sea snail, a marine gastropod mollusk in the family Ovulidae, one of the families of cowry allies.

Description
The length of the shell attains 16.6 mm.

Distribution
This marine species occurs off New Caledonia.

References

 Lorenz F. (2007) Two new species of Lunovula (Gastropoda: Caenogastropoda: Ovulidae) from New Caledonia and the Solomon Islands. Visaya 2(1): 64-69.
 Lorenz F. & Fehse D. (2009) The living Ovulidae. A manual of the families of allied cowries: Ovulidae, Pediculariidae and Eocypraeidae. Hackenheim: Conchbooks.
 Lorenz F. & Bouchet P. (2018). A new species of Lunovula from the South Pacific (Gastropoda: Ovulidae, Pediculariinae). Conchylia. 48(3-4): 15-18

boucheti
Gastropods described in 2007